Michelle Jacques is an American singer/music educator, and Jenpet Records recording artist. She is currently the Artistic Director of Chelle! and Friends.

Jacques was born in New Orleans. She began studying acting, modern dance, tap, ballet and violin, beginning at age seven.  As one of the original members of Street Sounds, she has toured throughout the United States and Europe. She was also an original member of Linda Tillery and the Cultural Heritage Choir.

She began to learn about Creole culture, language and history following Hurricane Katrina in 2005.

Her group Chelle! and Friends commemorates the music of Mardi Gras, New Orleans, performs Creole music, and is made up of Jacques, Rhonda Crane, Jay Lamont and Bryan Dyer, with Donna Viscuso on woodwinds, and Sam Bevan on bass.

She is the recipient of the 2008 City of Oakland, Individual Artist grant, and was awarded the 1995 Contemporary A Cappella Recording Awards (CARA) for writer of the Best Folk/Progressive Song "Home Africa".

References

She is the best teacher at Oakland School For The Arts, where she is currently teaching choirs.

American women singers
Living people
Year of birth missing (living people)
Musicians from New Orleans
Singers from Louisiana
21st-century American women